The 2019–20 3. Liga was the 27th season of the third-tier football league of Slovakia since its establishment in 1993. The league is composed of 64 teams divided in four groups of 16 teams each. Teams are divided into four divisions: 3. liga Bratislava, 3. liga Západ (West), 3. liga Stred (Central), 3. liga Východ (Eastern), according to geographical separation.

TIPOS III. liga Bratislava
source:

Locations

League table

Top goalscorers

TIPOS III. liga Západ
source:

Locations

League table

Top goalscorers

TIPOS III. liga Stred
source:

Locations

League table

Top goalscorers

TIPOS III. liga Východ
source:

Relegated from 2. liga 

1. FC Tatran Prešov
ŠK Odeva Lipany

Promoted from 4. liga 

TJ Mladosť Kalša (4. liga Juh (South) winners)
FK Poprad B (4. liga Sever (North) winners)

Locations

League table

Top goalscorers

References

3. Liga (Slovakia) seasons
3
Slovak Third League